Cornelia Tăutu (10 March 1938 – 24 March 2019) was a Romanian composer best known for film soundtracks.

Works
Tăutu has written works including:
Divertisment folcloric
Coralia for children's chorus and orchestra
Rota for chamber ensemble
De Doi (The Two) for viola and cello (1994)

Her music has been recorded and issued on CD including: 
Romanian Women Composers 2, Musica Nova and the Romanian Radio Broadcasting Corporation, 2006
MARIN CONSTANTIN, Electrecord
Romania Today (June 30, 1998) by Dinescu, Dediu, Stroe, Brumariu, et al., Pro Viva (Ger), ASIN: B000007TAJ

Filmography
Tăutu has composed music for films including:
1992 Ramînerea
1988 Drumet în calea lupilor
1988 The Moromete Family
1987 Cetatea ascunsa
1987 Zloty pociag
1983 Caruta cu mere
1983 Impossible Love
1980 Dumbrava minunata
1978 Actiunea Autobuzul
1978 Buzduganul cu trei peceti
1978 Together Again
1975 Patima

External links

References

1938 births
2019 deaths
20th-century classical composers
Romanian classical composers
Women classical composers
20th-century women composers